Cushing is a surname. Notable people with the surname include:

 Alonzo Cushing (1841–1863), U.S. Army officer and recipient of the Medal of Honor
 Arthur Cushing (1869–1944), Canadian politician
 Brian Cushing (born 1987), American football player
 Caleb Cushing (1800–1879), US legislator
 Charles Cushing (1905–1982), American composer 
 Christine Cushing, Canadian celebrity chef
 David Cushing (1920–2008), British fisheries biologist
 Eliza Lanesford Cushing (1794–1886), American-Canadian author and editor
 Frank Hamilton Cushing (1857–1900), American anthropologist
 Harvey Cushing (1869–1939), pioneer American neurosurgeon
 James M. Cushing (1908–1963), US Army mining engineer 
 James T. Cushing (1937–2002), American physicist and philosopher of science
 John Cushing (actor) (1719–1790), British stage actor
 John Perkins Cushing (1787–1862), American merchant and philanthropist
 Luther Cushing (1803–1856), author of one of the earliest works on parliamentary procedure
 Nathan Cushing (1742–1812), Justice of the Massachusetts Supreme Judicial Court
 Otho Cushing (c. 1820–1942), American artist 
 Peter Cushing (1913–1994), British actor 
 Robert Cushing (sculptor) (1841–1896), Irish sculptor
 Robert Reynolds Cushing (1952–2022), American politician
 Richard Cushing (1895–1970), American Cardinal of the Roman Catholic Church
 Stephen B. Cushing (died 1868), New York State Attorney General 1856–1857
 Thomas Cushing (1725–1788), American lawyer and statesman
 William Cushing (1732–1810), Associate Justice of the U.S. Supreme Court
 William B. Cushing (1842–1874), U.S. Navy officer
 William Henry Cushing (1852–1934), Canadian politician
 William Orcutt Cushing (1823–1902), American Unitarian minister and hymn writer

English-language surnames